Harold Jordan (10 July 1915 – 24 August 2001) was a Barbadian cricketer. He played in one first-class match for the Barbados cricket team in 1936/37.

See also
 List of Barbadian representative cricketers

References

External links
 

1915 births
2001 deaths
Barbadian cricketers
Barbados cricketers
People from Saint Michael, Barbados